Blizzard North (formerly known as Condor) was an American video game development studio based in San Mateo, California. The studio was the Bay Area division of Blizzard Entertainment, known for its Diablo series. The company was originally based in Redwood City, California, before moving a short distance away to San Mateo, with Blizzard proper being based in Irvine, southern California.

History
Blizzard North was founded in 1993 under the name Condor by David Brevik, Erich Schaefer and Max Schaefer at the request of Brevik. David Brevik served as the president of the company between 1993 and 2003, while the Schaefer brothers held the Vice President positions in the company. The company was purchased and renamed as Blizzard North by Blizzard Entertainment's former owner Davidson & Associates about nine months before the release of their hit PC game Diablo in 1997. However, Blizzard North had complete autonomy from Blizzard Entertainment while David Brevik and the Schaefer brothers continued to manage the company respectively as the President and Vice Presidents. Diablo was highly successful, and its 2000 sequel Diablo II even more so. An expansion pack, Diablo II: Lord of Destruction, followed the year after.

By June 2003 two new games were in production. The first game in production was Blizzard North's version of Diablo III which later was scrapped and restarted by Blizzard Entertainment. The second game was Diablo-like game which would take place in space. On June 30, however, several key employees left Blizzard North to form two new companies. Eight moved to form Flagship Studios, including Blizzard North founder and president David Brevik, the Schaefer brothers and Bill Roper who was transferred from Blizzard Entertainment to Blizzard North in late 1996. Another nine employees left to form Castaway Entertainment. By the time the exodus concluded, around 30 employees had left the company.

The resignations were partly due to a conflict with Blizzard Entertainment's owner, Vivendi, and partly due to employees wishing to start something new. Back at Blizzard North, however, the resignations had a common effect; of the two unannounced games that were in production, one was canceled. Blizzard Entertainment has since said the canceled game was a "Blizzard North kind of game".

On August 1, 2005, Blizzard Entertainment announced the closure of Blizzard North. A key reason for the closure was Blizzard North's poor development of what was to be Diablo III, which did not meet Vivendi's expectations. Former Blizzard North staffers including Joseph Lawrence, Wyatt Cheng, and Matt Uelmen subsequently appeared in the credits of Blizzard's next retail release, World of Warcraft: The Burning Crusade.  The work of former Blizzard North artist Phroilan Gardner was featured in editions of World of Warcraft: The Trading Card Game around the same time.

A few employees from the Diablo team, including Eric Sexton, Michio Okamura, and Steven Woo, organized to launch a new company, Hyboreal Games.

Castaway Entertainment 
Castaway Entertainment was established by former employees of Blizzard North, and was also based in Redwood City, California. The company signed a publishing agreement with Electronic Arts in March 2004, but had yet to produce any products when it was shut down in 2008.

Former Blizzard North members who joined the studio include Michael Scandizzo, Stefan Scandizzo, Alan Ackerman, Steven Woo, Rick Seis, Ted Bisson, Bruno Bowden, Peter Brevik, Michael Huang, Kelly Johnson (artist), Michio Okamura, Tom Ricket (also known as Sluggy Freelance's Shirt Guy Tom), and Fredrick Vaught (after whom the Halls of Vaught in Diablo II were named).

Other notable employees include game designer Bill Dunn and art director Rick Macaraeg.

On April 4, 2008, Michael Scandizzo announced that Castaway was suspending operations due to financial problems.

Games

As Condor
NFL Quarterback Club '95 (1994) - handheld versions
Justice League Task Force (1995) - Mega Drive/Genesis version
NFL Quarterback Club '96

As Blizzard North
Diablo (1996) - action role-playing game
Diablo II (2000) - action role-playing game
Diablo II: Lord of Destruction (2001) - expansion pack

Cancelled
 Diablo Junior
 NFLPA Superstars (for the canceled Panasonic M2 console)
 Diablo III (in development 2000-2005)

See also
 Runic Games

References

External links 
Blizzard website

Blizzard Entertainment
Video game development companies
Defunct video game companies of the United States
Video game companies established in 1993
Video game companies disestablished in 2005
Companies based in San Mateo, California
Defunct companies based in the San Francisco Bay Area